The 2008 UAE 2nd GP2 Asia Series round was a GP2 Asia Series motor race held on 11 and 12 April 2008 at Dubai Autodrome in Dubai, United Arab Emirates. It was the final round of the 2008 GP2 Asia Series.

Classification

Qualifying

Feature race 

 Bruno Senna finished 9th, but he was rejected for having his team change only one rear tyre when the sporting regulations requires that at least two tyres to be changed on the car during the mandatory pit stop.

Sprint race 

 Ho-Pin Tung finished 5th, but he was rejected because his car not conforming.

Standings after the event 

Drivers' Championship standings

Teams' Championship standings

 Note: Only the top five positions are included for both sets of standings.

See also 
 2008 UAE 2nd Speedcar Series round

Notes

References

GP2 Asia Series
GP2 Asia